Académie Carmen, also known as Whistler's School, was a short-lived Parisian art school founded by James McNeill Whistler. It operated from 1898 to 1901.

History 
The school opened in October 1898 in a large house and stable at No. 6 Passage Stanislas, near the Rue Notre Dame du Champs. The business side of the school was handled by Whistler's former model Carmen Rossi, for whom the school was named, and her musician husband. The number of students was limited to forty, most of whom were women. More than half of them were American, "with several also coming from England, Ireland, and Scotland." Instructors for the first year were Whistler (painting) and American sculptor Frederick William MacMonnies (life drawing). Whistler taught without pay as a "visiting professor," and appeared once a week to offer criticism.

Initially, all the students met in a single class. Whistler made his first appearance at the beginning of the second week, and, at his insistence, the students were separated into women's and men's classes. Experienced students were appointed teaching assistants. The women's class was led by Irish painter Inez Eleanor Bate for the length of the school's tenure. The men's class was led by a series of assistants—American painter Earl Stetson Crawford, Czech painter Alphonse Mucha, Italian painter Cyrus Cuneo, and lastly, American painter Clifford Addams. With a dearth of sculpture students, MacMonnies left after the first year.

In a 1906 magazine article, Cuneo described Whistler's eccentricities, his inability to communicate effectively as a teacher, and his strong favoritism toward the women's class: "Instead of sitting down in the usual French fashion and giving each pupil in turn a clear and matter-of-fact criticism, Whistler airily picked his way amongst the easels, glancing here and there, ignoring some canvases altogether, greeting others with 'Yes—yes.' " "Whistler's methods and manner confused the average students who came, but his faith in his system was as great as the students' unbelief." Despite the prestige of his fame and reputation, many of the students dropped out. The frustration of the male students was expressed in a poem Whistler found scrawled on a wall of the men's studio:
I bought a palette just like his,His colours and his brush.The devil of it is, you see,I did not buy his touch.

The frustration turned to resentment in the second year. Whistler's apprentice Inez Eleanor Bate recalled: "[A]t the latter part of the season he often refused to criticize in the men's class at all. He would call sometimes on Sunday mornings [when the school was empty], and take out and place upon easels the various studies that had been done by the men the previous week, and often he would declare that nothing interested him among them and that he should not criticize that week, that he could not face the 'blankness' of the atelier." By the third year, the men's life class was cancelled due to lack of students.

Whistler was not always in good health, which may have accounted for many of his absences. His doctors recommended convalescence in a warmer climate, and he sent New Year's greetings for 1901 to the students from Corsica. The school continued to struggle, and descended into quarrels and mistrust. "In the end, the want of confidence in him, his illness, and his absence broke up the school." Whistler announced its closing in a letter sent from Corsica, and read aloud to the students on April 6, 1901.

Whistler's hopes of establishing an art school in London under the management of apprentices Inez Eleanor Bate and Clifford Addams, who married in 1900, were defeated by his continued poor health. He died in London on July 17, 1903, at age 69.

Students

Lucien Abrams  
Clifford Addams (tutor)  
Alice Pike Barney  
Frederic Clay Bartlett  
Inez Eleanor Bate (tutor) 
Carlotta Blaurock 
Simon Bussy  
Blendon Reed Campbell  
Alson S. Clark  
Earl Stetson Crawford (tutor) 
Cyrus Cuneo (tutor) 
Edward Dufner  
Mary Foote  
Frederick Carl Frieseke  
Louise Elizabeth Garden MacLeod 
Lillian Genth  
Mary Hughitt Halliday  
Paul Henry  
Ilka Howells  
Henry Salem Hubbell  
Louise Williams Jackson  
John Christen Johansen  
Gwen John  
Lydia Longacre  
Will Hicok Low  
Alphonse Mucha (tutor) 
Mary Augusta Mullikin 
Ida Nettleship  
Anna Ostroumova-Lebedeva  
Lawton S. Parker  
Ambrose McCarthy Patterson  
Hugh Ramsay  
Gwen Salmond  
William Otis Swett 
Nell Marion Tenison  
Eugene Paul Ullman  
Mary van der Veer  
Hans Albrecht von Harrach  
Marie von Rietgenstein  
Emmi Walther  
Charles Henry White  
Alice Woods

References

Art schools in Paris
Educational institutions established in 1898
Educational institutions disestablished in 1901
James Abbott McNeill Whistler
1898 establishments in France
1901 disestablishments in France